WKXW (101.5 FM, "New Jersey 101.5") is a commercial FM radio station licensed to serve Trenton, New Jersey. It is owned by Townsquare Media.

History
The station went on the air on August 27, 1962, as WBUD-FM. Its call sign subsequently changed in 1967 to WBJH, which stood for Bill and Joy Hardin, the son and daughter-in-law of the owner. The station's call sign changed to WTRT in 1979 and rebranded as "The New T-101 FM". In 1980, the station's call sign was changed to WKXW-FM, under its new owner Fidelity Communications. It was playing a hot adult contemporary format as "The All New Kix 101 & A 1/2 FM" and later "Kix 101.5". By the late 80s, the station evolved into more of a gold-based adult contemporary format. Its weekend Saturday oldies show evolved into an all oldies format from the 1950s through early 70s on overnights and weekends before the change to its current weekday talk format, which came in 1990 when it was sold to Press Communications. The sale to Millennium Radio Group took place in 2001.

On March 1, 1990, at 5pm, "New Jersey 101.5", conceived by Sabo Media CEO, Walter Sabo, became the first full-time FM Talk station in America targeted for a younger audience. Mark Sheppard, who later went to middays, kicked off the format playing Bill Haley & The Comets' "Rock Around The Clock".

Since the 1990s, the station has a talk and news format during the week, with oldies music on the overnights and weekend. Initially, the oldies format was 1960s-based with a few pre-1964 oldies and a 1970s oldie or two each hour. By the early-to-mid-1990s, more 1970s music was added and by the early-2000s, 1980s music from 1980 to 1982 was added occasionally. Between 2000 and 2005, music from between 1986 and 1989 was added to the lineups. Gradually, at the same time, songs from 1964 and older were gradually reduced in the late-1990s and gone by 2000. In September 2007, 1960s music was removed from the "60s, 70s, and 80s" weekend music programming ID, and nearly all 1960s music had been removed from the playlist. However, in May 2012, "60s" was added back to the weekend music programming ID, coinciding with a limited but steady increase in music airplay focusing on select titles by well-known artists.

In the mid-to-late-1990s, music was ended on weekday overnights and now airs strictly on weekends and some holidays.

The station has, at times, provided a simulcast on various AM and FM stations in the Atlantic City area, beyond the reach of its main transmitter. The most recent simulcast ceased in June 2009 when then-WXKW changed formats to ESPN Sports Radio. The station's morning show was also simulcast for a time on regional cable network CN8 in the late 1990s and early 2000s, with cameras mounted in the radio studio showing the station's personalities on-camera.

In 2011, California-based Oaktree Capital signed a deal to buy Millennium Radio Group; after taking over, Oaktree transferred the Millennium stations to Townsquare Media.

Controversies
In 2008, the station's parent company was sued by a photographer for copyright infringement, and defamation with regards to the online posting of a photocopy of a New Jersey Monthly magazine photograph. Photographer Peter Murphy sent a notice of copyright infringement to the station to remove a photo Craig Carton and Ray Rossi, which had been photocopied from a March 2006 issue of the magazine; the station also posted edited versions of the picture that were submitted by listeners. While the station complied with the takedown request, Carton and Rossi complained on-air about Murphy's conduct, allegedly saying that Murphy was "not to be trusted" and that people "should avoid doing business" with him. Carton and Rossi also alleged that Murphy "was a homosexual." In April 2008, Murphy brought suit for direct, contributory, and vicarious copyright infringement, violation of the DMCA, and defamation of character against Millennium Radio Group, Carton, and Rossi. The Third Circuit ruled that the station's actions did constitute both a violation of the DMCA and copyright infringement, which vacated the district court's judgment.

On July 26, 2018, the station came under fire after hosts Judi Franco and Dennis Malloy referred to New Jersey Attorney General Gurbir Grewal as "turban man" while on air. The hosts were suspended for 10 days.

In December 2018, Judi Franco garnered controversy when called the state's "Move Over" law "silly" and unnecessary in an opinion piece she posted on the station's website under the headline "Dead cops make bad laws."

Some of the station's personalities have garnered attention for their promotion of anti-vaccination viewpoints (including opposition to COVID-19 vaccines and COVID-19 vaccine mandates), including morning host Bill Spadea, and host Dennis Malloy of the midday show The Dennis & Judi Show. In September 2022, Spadea and station owner Townsquare Media were sued for defamation by Steven Tobias—a child psychologist who had made appearances on the station to discuss the impact of the pandemic on schools—after Spadea called for him to be "indicted for child abuse" for promoting the wearing of face masks in schools.

New Jersey-centric branding
The station has strongly branded its New Jersey-ness, with its announcers frequently self-identifying "New Jersey 101.5" and with its bumper message intoning "Not New York. Not Philadelphia. Proud to be New Jersey!", as well as its branded New Jersey Fast Traffic and New Jersey Instant Weather. The New Jersey-centric nature of the station is emphasized in the traffic reports, in that they refer to traffic direction on bridges and tunnels as "entering New Jersey" or "leaving New Jersey" instead of the more traditional designations of "into the city/inbound" or "out of the city/outbound". As well, current temperatures of different samples of towns in New Jersey are given after the weather reports. Despite the station's branding, the 101.5 signal does not reach the majority of Cape May, Salem and Sussex Counties while the signal's coverage of Atlantic, Bergen, Cumberland and Hudson Counties is poor at best, though digital streaming options do allow full-state and even out-of-state reach of the station through other means.

Ratings
The way WKXW has been able to maintain a strong listener base can be attributed to several factors, including:
Radio stations in New York City and Philadelphia tend to only mention New Jersey issues, news, politics, etc. in short regional rundowns outside of the most high-profile stories, if at all (for instance, state weather is mentioned by some New York and Philadelphia stations under the vague terms "The Beaches" or "The Jersey Shore" without delineation of location for those observations). For decades the station was the highest rated FM Talk station measured, according to Arbitron/Nielsen Media.
New Jersey has only two English speaking commercial television stations: Secaucus-licensed WWOR-TV (channel 9), a MyNetworkTV affiliate, and Wildwood-licensed WMGM-TV (channel 40), an NBC affiliate until the start of 2015 (currently a True Crime Network station owned by Univision with no breakaways from network programming). Both stations no longer have news departments or local newscasts. WMGM-TV covers the outer fringes of the Delaware Valley and Philadelphia, while WWOR-TV primarily serves the New York Tri-State Area. On July 2, 2013, traditional newscasts (which were nominally focused on New Jersey issues) on WWOR were discontinued for an outside produced interview program called Chasing New Jersey, which later took on a generic social media focus under the title Chasing News with only a vague focus on New Jerseyan issues. WMGM-TV ended their NBC affiliation on January 1, 2015, due to the 2017 Spectrum Incentive Auction. The news department was also terminated, though it remains under contract to the owners which sold off the station license, and they may relaunch it on another station. Altice USA also offers the regional cable news channel News 12 New Jersey to the subscribers of several pay-TV systems in the state. PBS member network NJTV (now NJ PBS) is the only remaining television operation with a New Jersey-focused newscast, but was converted to private ownership from state backing in July 2011 under Chris Christie's campaign promises to cut state expenses and lay-off New Jersey Network staff, and is currently operated by Newark-licensed WNET (operating from a New York City base), which also airs the NJTV newscasts on WNET itself for Northern New Jersey. Smaller independent stations such as WMBC-TV, WMGM-TV, WUVP-DT, WMCN-TV and WACP also have newscasts to serve local audiences of Northern and Southern New Jersey, respectively, except WMBC-TV's news also focuses on New York and Fairfield County, Connecticut, but SNJ Today News was cancelled in February 2019, due to budget issues, SNJ Today was subsequently sold off to the Hope Loft non-profit in Cumberland County, New Jersey. Local news will return to South Jersey in October 2020, from New Jersey News Network on WNWT-LD 37. There was also WOND radio news at 6 PM, which was cancelled in April 2019, due to budget issues and SJNtv, which disbanded in July 2020. WMCN-TV previously had newscasts as WWAC-TV (channel 53) from July 1981 to 1984 as an ABC affiliate, which was also cancelled due to budget issues. TSM News South Jersey Edition was cancelled in 2000, due to budget issues. Local news programming on WSJT-TV (channel 65) was also cancelled due to budget issues and that station also went bankrupt.

Townsquare News Network
The station is the flagship broadcasting arm of the Townsquare New Jersey News Network as heard on twelve radio stations throughout the state. The network consists of WOBM-FM in Toms River, WOBM (AM) in Lakewood, WCHR-FM in Manahawkin, WJLK in Asbury Park, WADB in Tinton Falls, WFPG in Atlantic City, WSJO in Egg Harbor City, WPUR in Atlantic City, and WENJ in Atlantic City. Various bureaus throughout the state share stories with the Ewing headquarters.

Format
The station's proprietary format was created in 1990. It was idea of Sabo Media CEO Walter Sabo. Sabo, a former NBC and ABC executive, branded the station, built its approach to call-in radio and gave the station its Jersey-centric point of view. His initiatives were carried out by Jay Sorensen and Perry Michael Simon, with the help of Press Broadcasting chief Bob McAllan and general manager John Dziuba. Subsequent program directors include Leigh Jacobs and Eric Johnson.

On-air personalities

Current
Eric Scott – host of the early morning news show New Jersey's First News With Eric Scott as well as the monthly "Ask the Governor".
Bill Spadea – host of the morning show; took over hosting duties from the original and longtime host, Jim Gearhart, in December 2015.
Dennis Malloy and Judi Franco – hosts of the mid-day show, The Dennis & Judi Show, which mixes a variety of topics, from New Jersey politics, to the mundane, irreverent issues; the show first aired in 1997. 
Jeff Deminski and Bill Doyle – hosts of The Deminski and Doyle Show which returned on July 5, 2011, after leaving for the Detroit market in 1999.
Steve Trevelise – host of the evening show, a mix of comedy and current events.
Big Joe Henry – host of the weekend music shows, showcasing a mix of oldies retro and more modern music, together with a retro DJ style featuring reverb, Big Joe Jokes (often revolving around his own prodigious weight), and sound effects. Henry is known for his catch phrase "livin' large and lovin' life." Also on-site hosts a Sunday-evening talent show in Point Pleasant, New Jersey during the summer.

Supporting personalities include Dan Zarrow on weather, David Mattau and Patrick Lavery on news, Bob Williams, Jill Myra, "Tom Rivers" (aka Matt Ward from 1010 WINS), and Bernie Wagenblast for traffic.

Alumni
Notable radio personalities who have worked at the station include:
Philadelphia radio Hall of Famer Hy Lit and his son Sam Lit, who anchored the air staff in the early 80s
John and Ken (John Kobylt and Ken Chiampou, now at KFI Los Angeles)
Scott and Casey (Scott Hasick, currently at WMVN/WARH St. Louis)
Tommy G (named to Talkers Magazine Frontier 50)
Paul "PJ" Cunningham worked on-air at KIX 101 1/2 from 1987 to 1989. Has been host of The Bender Nation morning show on KBKS-FM in Seattle since 2001.
Jeff McKay – traffic reporter
Mary Walter – former "Passion Phones" host from 1991 - 1996 and 2002 - 2006. Multiple Gracie Award winner. Talkers Heavy Hundred. Currently at WMAL-FM Washington DC, Fox News Radio & Sirius Patriot Channel. She is currently a commentator on various Newsmax TV shows and is a regular with Michael Reagan on the Chris Salcedo Show.
Two incarnations of the Jersey Guys, first with Craig Carton and Ray Rossi (in summer 2002) and second (in summer 2007) with Casey Bartholomew and Ray Rossi:
Craig Carton, the former Jersey Guys, later co-host of Boomer and Carton in the Morning at WFAN in New York and CBS Sports Network
Casey and Rossi (Casey Bartholomew's second stint with NJ 101.5 lasted from 2007–2011 as a Jersey Guy along with Ray Rossi after Craig Carton's departure in 2007).

References

External links
WKXW official website

Lawrence Township, Mercer County, New Jersey
Ewing Township, New Jersey
Trenton, New Jersey
KXW
News and talk radio stations in the United States
Oldies radio stations in the United States
Radio stations established in 1962
Townsquare Media radio stations